Caldercruix railway station serves the village of Caldercruix in North Lanarkshire, Scotland. It is managed by ScotRail and is on the North Clyde Line. Originally opened by the Bathgate and Coatbridge Railway in 1862, it was closed in 1956 then reopened in 2011 as part of the reopening of the Airdrie–Bathgate rail link.

History
The station was originally opened as part of the Bathgate and Coatbridge Railway on 11 August 1862 and closed on 9 January 1956.

Reopening
The station was due to be reopened as part of the Airdrie-Bathgate Rail Link on 12 December 2010. However, building work was held up by bad weather, and a bus service ferried passengers until the station was able to open. The reopening eventually took place on 13 February 2011.

The Airdrie-Bathgate Rail Link is a project created to enable Glasgow and Edinburgh to be linked via a fourth route by reopening the railway between the towns of Airdrie and Bathgate.

Services

In the evenings and on Sundays the westbound terminus is  rather than Milngavie.

References

Notes

Sources 
 
 
 Disused stations

External links
 RAILSCOT on Bathgate and Coatbridge Railway 

Railway stations in North Lanarkshire
Former North British Railway stations
Railway stations in Great Britain opened in 1862
Railway stations in Great Britain closed in 1956
Railway stations in Great Britain opened in 2011
Railway stations served by ScotRail
Reopened railway stations in Great Britain
1862 establishments in Scotland